Hearth Fires is a 1972 French film directed by Serge Korber.  The film is also known as La Divorziata (Italy).

Synopsis
Marie-Louise (Anne Girardot) is a woman whose love for her ex-husband will not die. The Lawyer Alexandre (Jean Rochefort) left her, because she attended a few leftist marches and demonstrations. While her daughter Laura (Claude Jade) falls in love with Marc (Bernard Fresson), Marie-Louise keeps hoping that Alexandre will come back to her. Laura helps her to fight for love and Marie-Louise is so attached to this idea that when her son (Bernard Le Coq) finally convinces her that he will never return, the realization has dire consequences.

Jean Rochefort played his first big major role. In this film he played with 41 years a family father of adult children (the young Claude Jade was already 23 and Bernard Fresson who has played Jade's fiancé one year younger than Rochefort). To be older, he had a moustache, since this film his trademark, which he had removed only once (1996 in "Ridicule").

Cast
Annie Girardot (Marie Louise Boursault)
Jean Rochefort (Alexandre Boursault)
Claude Jade (Laura Boursault)
Bernard Le Coq (Jean-Paul Boursault)
Bernard Fresson (Marc Champenois)
Jean Bouise (Father Yves Bouteiller)
Gabriella Boccardo (Annie)
Ilaria Occhini (Clotilde)

Awards
This movie was nominated for Best Picture at the 1972 Cannes Film Festival.

Discography

The CD soundtrack composed by Michel Legrand is available on Music Box Records label (website).

References

External links

1972 films
1972 drama films
Italian drama films
French drama films
1970s French-language films
Films directed by Serge Korber
Films scored by Michel Legrand
1970s French films
1970s Italian films